Pencak Silat at the 2005 Southeast Asian Games took place in the Cebu Coliseum, Cebu City, Cebu, Philippines.

The event was held from November 30 to December 4.

Medal table

Medalists

Art

Combat

Men

Women

External links
Southeast Asian Games Official Results

2005 Southeast Asian Games events
2005